Edward Maurice Bronfman,  (November 1, 1927 – April 4, 2005) was a Canadian businessman, philanthropist, and member of the Bronfman family.

Born in Montreal, Quebec, the son of Allan Bronfman and the nephew of Samuel Bronfman, founder of Seagram, he attended Selwyn House School, Bishop's College School and Babson College, where he graduated in 1950 with a degree in business administration. He founded (with his brother, Peter Bronfman) Edper Investments (now called Brookfield Asset Management), a conglomerate company which once had an estimated CAD $100 billion in assets under management and included several of the largest corporations in Canada. From 1971 to 1978, he and his brother owned the Montreal Canadiens. The team won four Stanley Cups under their ownership, in 1973, 1976, 1977 and 1978.

In 2000 he was made an Officer of the Order of Canada in recognition of his dedication to philanthropy.

He was married twice (once divorced), and had three sons: Paul, David and Brian.

He died from colon cancer.

References

Further reading 
 Susan Gittins, Behind Closed Doors: The Rise and Fall of Canada's Edper Bronfman and Reichman Empires (1995)
 Patricia Best and Ann Shortell, The Brass Ring: Power, Influence and the Brascan Empire (1988)

See also 
List of Bishop's College School alumni

1927 births
2005 deaths
Edward Bronfman
Businesspeople from Montreal
Canadian sports businesspeople
Deaths from cancer in Ontario
Deaths from colorectal cancer
Bishop's College School alumni
Jewish Canadian philanthropists
Officers of the Order of Canada
Canadian company founders
Canadian real estate businesspeople
Canadian people of Russian-Jewish descent
20th-century philanthropists